Lorenzo Jules Staelens (born 30 April 1964) is a Belgian professional football manager and former player. He most recently coached Dutch club HSV Hoek.

Having started his career as a defensive midfielder, he finished it as a sweeper at nearly 40, and scored more than 100 goals overall.

Staelens appeared for the Belgium national team in three World Cups, adding the Euro 2000 tournament played on home soil.

Club career
Born in Lauwe, Staelens started his professional career with K.V. Kortrijk at already 23, and his two solid seasons there attracted the attention of top division giants Club Brugge KV.

There, he proceeded to form a legendary midfield partnership with Franky Van der Elst, that would last nearly a decade. Staelens played 369 games in all competitions for the club, scoring 105 goals.

At already 34, and more often than not playing in the backline, he moved to R.S.C. Anderlecht, still being instrumental in the club's back-to-back championships (2000 and 2001), and winning the Belgian Golden Shoe in 1999; however, he did not finish his last year, moving to Japan's Ōita Trinita in early 2001 and retiring shortly after.

Staelens took up coaching subsequently, first with R.E. Mouscron. After only two months at V.C. Eendracht Aalst, he returned to first club Kortrijk as its general manager, only returning to the benches in 2007, as assistant coach at K.S.V. Roeselare. 
Staelens kept that role in the subsequent years, with the other team from Bruges, Cercle KSV.

International career
As an inexperienced international player, Staelens was selected to Belgium's squad for the 1990 FIFA World Cup; there, he appeared in the 2–1 group stage loss against Spain.

From then on, Staelens became an essential national team member, representing it also at the 1994 and 1998 World Cups and in UEFA Euro 2000, totalling a further 10 complete matches.

Statistics

Club

National team

Honours

Club 
Club Brugge
 Belgian First Division: 1989–90, 1991–92, 1995–96, 1997–98
 Belgian Cup: 1990–91, 1994–95, 1995–96
 Belgian Super Cup: 1990, 1991, 1992, 1994, 1996
 Bruges Matins: 1990, 1992, 1993, 1995, 1996
 Amsterdam Tournament: 1990
 Jules Pappaert Cup: 1991, 1995

Anderlecht
 Belgian First Division: 1999–00
 Belgian League Cup: 2000
 Belgian Super Cup: 2000
 Belgian Sports Team of the Year: 2000

Individual 
 Belgian Professional Footballer of the Year: 1993–94
 Belgian Golden Shoe: 1999

References

External links

Club Brugge archives 
Lorenzo Staelens at Footballdatabase

1964 births
Living people
People from Menen
Footballers from West Flanders
Belgian footballers
Association football midfielders
Association football defenders
Belgian Pro League players
K.V. Kortrijk players
Club Brugge KV players
R.S.C. Anderlecht players
J2 League players
Oita Trinita players
Belgium international footballers
1990 FIFA World Cup players
1994 FIFA World Cup players
1998 FIFA World Cup players
UEFA Euro 2000 players
Belgian expatriate footballers
Expatriate footballers in Japan
Belgian expatriate sportspeople in Japan
Belgian football managers
Royal Excel Mouscron managers
Cercle Brugge K.S.V. managers
S.C. Eendracht Aalst managers